Majestoso is Spanish and Portuguese for majestic. It can refer to:

 Estádio Moisés Lucarelli, football stadium in São Paulo
 Clássico Majestoso, a football (soccer) match between Corinthians and São Paulo
 Maestoso, a musical direction